Rauha S. Virtanen (28 June 1931 – 20 March 2019) was a Finnish author who wrote youth literature as well as plays. Virtanen received numerous literary awards, including the Topelius Prize in 1971, the State Prize for Youth Literature in 1971, and the Tirlittan Prize of the Finnish Writers' Union in 2003.

Biography
Rauha Susanna Virtanen was born in Alavus, 28 June 1931.

Inspired by Lucy Maud Montgomery's novel Emily of New Moon, Virtanen's first work, Seljan tytöt  ("Selja's Girls"), appeared in 1955 and became into a four-part series inspired by Louisa M. Alcott's Little Women. In 1968, Ruusunen was turned into a book-based mini-series for Yle TV2, Pieni rakkaustarina ("A Little Love Story"). The novel deals with the relationship between an underage girl and an adult man. Virtanen's early work has humor, excitement and romance, but later productions focused on young people facing difficult solutions who see the social and political realities of their environment.

Virtanen's daughter Arja Pettersson is a theater director. Virtanen died in Helsinki, 20 March 2019.

Awards
 Topelius Prize, 1971
 State Prize for Youth Literature, 1971
 Tirlittan Prize of the Finnish Writers' Union, 2003

Selected works
Novels
Seljan tytöt. Porvoo: WSOY, 1955.
Tapaamme Seljalla: Seljan tyttöjen uusia vaiheita. Porvoo: WSOY, 1957.
Kiurut laulavat. Porvoo: WSOY, 1959.
Virva Seljan yksityisasia. Porvoo: WSOY, 1960.
Tuntematon Selja. Helsinki: WSOY, 1964.
Luumupuu kukkii. Helsinki: WSOY, 1965.
Tuletko sisarekseni. Helsinki: WSOY, 1966.
Ruusunen. Helsinki: WSOY, 1968.
Joulukuusivarkaus. Helsinki: WSOY, 1970.
Lintu pulpetissa. Helsinki: WSOY, 1972. .
Seljalta maailman ääreen. Helsinki: WSOY, 2001. .
Seljan Tuli ja Lumi. Helsinki: WSOY, 2009. . 

Plays
Avaruusmekko (1966)
Tässä on Hely Ahonen (1974)
Laulukokeet (1976)
Jääkö Pekka luokalle? (1977)
Rööki-Rocky (1978)
Pääsy kielletty (1979)
Kolme mummoa (1982)

References

2019 deaths
1931 births
People from Alavus
20th-century Finnish novelists
21st-century Finnish novelists
Finnish women novelists
Finnish dramatists and playwrights
Finnish women dramatists and playwrights
20th-century Finnish women writers
21st-century Finnish women writers
Finnish children's writers
Finnish women children's writers